Rollandia may refer to:
 Rollandia (bird), a genus of birds in the family Podicipedidae
 Rollandia, a former genus of plants now included in the genus Cyanea
 1269 Rollandia, an asteroid